William Thomas Farmiloe (15 September 1863 – 4 July 1946) was Archdeacon of Sudbury from 1921 until 1930.

Farmiloe was educated at Queens' College, Cambridge and Ely Theological College. He was ordained in 1887 and served curacies at St Mary's, Barnes and St James's, Piccadilly. He was Vicar of St Peter, Great Windmill Street, Piccadilly from 1894 to 1905; of St Augustine, Victoria Park, London from 1905 to 1909; and of Nayland, Suffolk from 1909 to 1914. He was Canon Missioner of the Diocese of St Edmundsbury and Ipswich from 1914 to 1930; and Chaplain of All Saints, Rome from 1930 to 1933.

Farmiloe married his wife, the children's book writer and illustrator Edith Farmiloe, in 1891.

References

1863 births
1946 deaths
Alumni of Ely Theological College
Alumni of Queens' College, Cambridge
Archdeacons of Sudbury
19th-century English Anglican priests
20th-century English Anglican priests